The Qing Ding Pearl (《慶頂珠》, simplified 庆顶珠) is a Chinese play. It dates to the Song Dynasty and is still performed in adapted forms in the Beijing Opera.

The play is known by other titles: Two sections (折 zhe) of the main play are sometimes performed separately as The Fisherman's Revenge《漁夫恨》 or A Fisherman Kills a Family (《打漁殺家》, simplified 打渔杀家 dayu sha jia) also Collecting the Fishing Tax (《討漁稅》 taoyushui).

Plot
The play tells the story of Xiao En (whose real identity is Ruan Xiaoqi from Water Margin), a poor fisherman and his daughter who seeks bloody revenge after their livelihoods are taxed away by the overbearing Squire Ding. Squire Ding sends tax collectors and boxers to Xiao's fishing vessel but the fisherman refuses because the tax is illegal and the river had run dry. There's no fish for him to be taxed on. Two swashbucklers named Li Jun and Ni Rong help Xiao En. The now bloodied Boxers escape and report to Squire Ding. For his transgression, Xiao is whipped. Angered, he and his daughter go to Squire Ding's residence – The Ding Mansion. They sneak in, his daughter wearing the Qing Ding Pearl to masquerade as a noble. Inside, the pair slays everyone inside.

Music
The play is a xipi (西皮 western skins) play.

History
The twentieth-century Chinese actor Mei Lanfang frequently performed the role of the fisherman's daughter to great acclaim.

References

Chinese operas
Peking operas
Song dynasty in fiction
Works based on Water Margin
Plays set in the 12th century